This is a list of museums in Columbus, Ohio and non-profit and university art galleries.

The city's first museum was the Walcutt Museum, opened July 1851. At its opening, the museum had about six wax figures and a few paintings. It grew to have about 20 wax figures, several hundred animal specimens, and about 100 quality oil paintings.

Museums in operation

Planned museums

Former museums

See also 
List of museums in Ohio for other museums in Franklin County and the rest of the state
List of museums in Cincinnati
List of museums in Cleveland

References

External links 

 Ohio Museums Association

Museums
Museums in Columbus
Columbus, Ohio